Cochemiea is a genus of cactus. It has previously been synonymized with Mammillaria, but molecular phylogenetic studies have shown that when broadly circumscribed, Mammillaria is not monophyletic, and Cochemiea has been accepted as a separate genus.

Taxonomy
A 2021 molecular phylogenetic study of the "mammilloid clade", which included the genera Cochemiea, Coryphantha, Cumarinia, Escobaria, Mammillaria, Neolloydia and Ortegocactus, showed that it consisted of four monophyletic groups, which the authors re-circumscribed into four genera: Cumarinia; Mammillaria, with a reduced number of species; Coryphantha, expanded to include species previously placed in Mammillaria and Escobaria; and Cochemiea, expanded to include a large number of species previously placed in Mammillaria, as well as Neolloydia conoidea.

Species
In 2021, Breslin, Wojciechowski and Majure placed the following species in the genus, some already placed there and some moved from Mammillaria, Neolloydia, Neomammillaria and Ortegocactus. , Plants of the World Online accepted in the genus the species moved by Breslin et al.

References

Cactoideae
Cactoideae genera